Abies durangensis is a species of conifer in the family Pinaceae. It was described botanically by Maximino Martínez in 1942 and is found only in Mexico (Durango, Chihuahua, Coahuila, Jalisco and Sinaloa).

References

durangensis
Least concern plants
Plants described in 1942
Endemic flora of Mexico
Taxonomy articles created by Polbot
Flora of the Sierra Madre Occidental